{{DISPLAYTITLE:C19H30O5}}
The molecular formula C19H30O5 (molar mass: 338.43 g/mol) may refer to:

 Dodecyl gallate,
 Idebenone, a synthetic analog of coenzyme Q10
 Piperonyl butoxide (PBO)

Molecular formulas